The 2002 Australian Sports Sedan Championship was an Australian motor racing competition open to Group 3D Sports Sedans. The title, which is recognised by the Confederation of Australian Motor Sport as the 18th Australian Sports Sedan Championship, was won by Tony Ricciardello driving an Alfa Romeo GTV Chevrolet.

Calendar

The championship was contested over a five round series.

Points system
Championship points were awarded on a 20-17-15-14-13-12-11-10-9-8 basis for 1st through to 10th place in each race and an additional point was awarded to the driver setting the fastest time in Qualifying for each round.

Vehicles broadly similar to Group 3D Sports Sedans were able to compete in championship races by invitation, however, only drivers of cars issued with a Group 3D log book were eligible to score points.

Standings

References

National Sports Sedan Series
Sports Sedan Championship